Victor William James Sluce (May 21, 1928 – October 1, 1991) was a Canadian ice hockey player with the East York Lyndhursts. He won a silver medal at the 1954 World Ice Hockey Championships in Stockholm, Sweden. He also played for the Scarborough Dukes and Scarborough Rangers in the OHA.

References

1928 births
1991 deaths
Canadian ice hockey right wingers
East York Lyndhursts players
People from East York, Toronto
Ice hockey people from Toronto